is a one-shot Japanese manga written and illustrated by Souya Himawari. It is licensed in North America by Digital Manga Publishing, which released the manga through its imprint, Juné, on February 11, 2009. Houbunsha released the manga on March 28, 2003.

Reception
Mania.com's Briana Lawrence criticises the manga's ending saying, "the ending for “Happiness Recommended” is decent, but the ending for “Another Rainy Day” felt incomplete". Active Anime's Rachel Bentham commends the manga for its "fun, appealing art style". Comic Book Bin's Leroy Douresseaux comments that "the combative gay romance between Yakiharu and Makoto is funny and gentle – more romantic ( manga) than explicit (yaoi manga)".

References

External links

Comedy anime and manga
2003 manga
Josei manga
Yaoi anime and manga
Houbunsha manga
Digital Manga Publishing titles